The Meeting Hauts-de-France Pas-de-Calais (formerly Meeting Pas de Calais) also called Meeting International de Liévin (International Meeting of Liévin) is an annual indoor track and field competition which takes place in February at Arena Stade Couvert in Liévin, France. It is one of the events of the World Athletics Indoor Tour organised by World Athletics.

History 
The first meeting was held in 1988, two years after the construction of the Arena Stade Couvert de Liévin to host the 1987 European Athletics Indoor Championships.  

From 1988 onwards the meeting was held every year until 2007 and then from 2009 to 2012. Due to technical problems and work delays, the meeting of 2013 was cancelled. In 2018, the meeting was held again as an EA Indoor Permit Meeting. From 2020 onwards the meeting was one of the events of the World Athletics Indoor Tour.

World records
Over the course of its history, numerous world records have been set at the Meeting Pas de Calais.

Meeting records

Men

Women

Notes

References

External links
Official website
Meeting Pas de Calais Records

IAAF Indoor Permit Meetings
Athletics competitions in France
Recurring events established in 1988
Sport in Pas-de-Calais